The results of the 2015 Little League World Series were determined between August 21 and August 30, 2015 in South Williamsport, Pennsylvania. The tournament was originally scheduled to begin on August 20, however inclement weather resulted in the postponement of all first day games. 16 teams were divided into two groups, one with eight teams from the United States and another with eight international teams, with both groups playing a modified double-elimination tournament. In each group, the last remaining undefeated team faced the last remaining team with one loss, with the winners of those games advancing to play for the Little League World Series championship.

Double-elimination stage

United States

Winner's bracket

Game 2: Texas 1, Oregon 0

Game 4: California 14, Kentucky 2

Game 6: South Carolina 7, Rhode Island 1

Game 8: Pennsylvania 18, Missouri 0

Game 14: Texas 8, California 4

Game 16: Pennsylvania 9, South Carolina 8

Game 24: Pennsylvania 3, Texas 0

Loser's bracket

Game 10: Kentucky 7, Oregon 5

Game 12: Rhode Island 6, Missouri 3

Game 18: Kentucky 4, South Carolina 3

Game 20: California 10, Rhode Island 3

Game 22: California 11, Kentucky 3

Game 26: Texas 9, California 7

International

Winner's bracket

Game 1: Uganda 4, Dominican Republic 1

Game 3: Venezuela 5, Australia 2

Game 5: Mexico 1, Canada 0

Game 7: Japan 7, Chinese Taipei 5

Game 13: Venezuela 7, Uganda 0

Game 15: Japan 3, Mexico 1

Game 23: Japan 5, Venezuela 4

Loser's bracket

Game 9: Australia 3, Dominican Republic 0

Game 11: Chinese Taipei 16, Canada 4

Game 17: Mexico 14, Australia 3

Game 19: Chinese Taipei 5, Uganda 0

Game 21: Mexico 11, Chinese Taipei 1

Game 25: Mexico 11, Venezuela 0

Crossover games

Game A: Dominican Republic 7, Oregon 3

Game B: Missouri 18, Canada 6

Single-elimination stage

International Championship: Japan 1, Mexico 0

United States Championship: Pennsylvania 3, Texas 2

Third-place game: Texas 6, Mexico 4

World Championship Game: Japan 18, Pennsylvania 11

References

External links
Full schedule from littleleague.org 

2015 Little League World Series